John Hillcoat (born 1960) is an Australian-Canadian film director, screenwriter, and music video director.

Early life
Hillcoat was born in Queensland, Australia, and was raised in Hamilton, Ontario, Canada. As a child, his paintings were featured in the Art Gallery of Hamilton. He attended Sir John A. Macdonald Secondary School in Hamilton, Ontario, and was enrolled in the Special Art Program. He was active with the McMaster University Film Board most notably producing an animated short titled "The Finger".

Career
Hillcoat has often worked with Nick Cave, the band Depeche Mode, and actor Guy Pearce. The Road, his adaptation of the novel by Cormac McCarthy, premiered at the 2009 Toronto Film Festival, and was released in the U.S. in November 2009. His 2012 film, Lawless, competed for the Palme d'Or at the 2012 Cannes Film Festival. Hillcoat's film, Triple 9 was released in 2016. In 2017, he directed "Crocodile", an episode of the anthology series Black Mirror.

Filmography

Films

Music videos

Television
Black Mirror (2011) TV Series
Episode 4.03 "Crocodile"
George & Tammy (2022)

Awards and nominations

References

External links

1961 births
ARIA Award winners
Australian expatriates in Canada
Australian film directors
Australian music video directors
Australian screenwriters
English-language film directors
Living people
People from Queensland
Writers from Hamilton, Ontario